Snieguolė Narevičiūtė-Šeršen (born 26 October 1967) is a Soviet (Lithuanian) sprint canoer who competed in the late 1980s. She won a bronze medal in the K-4 500 m event at the 1987 ICF Canoe Sprint World Championships in Duisburg.

References

Living people
Soviet female canoeists
Lithuanian female canoeists
ICF Canoe Sprint World Championships medalists in kayak
1967 births